Ambrose Williams Clark (February 19, 1810 – October 13, 1887) was a U.S. Representative from New York, serving 1861–1865.

Biography
Born near Cooperstown, New York, Clark attended the public schools, was trained as a printer, and became active in the newspaper business as an advocate of Whig Party politics. He was publisher of the Otsego Journal from 1831 to 1836, the Northern Journal in Lewis County from 1836 to 1844, and the Northern New York Journal in Watertown from 1844 to 1860.

Clark became a Republican when the party was founded in the mid-1850s. In 1859 and 1860 he served as Watertown's Town Supervisor and a member of the Jefferson County Board of Supervisors.

He was elected as a Republican to the Thirty-seventh and Thirty-eighth Congresses (March 4, 1861 – March 4, 1865).

He was appointed consul at Valparaíso, Chile by President Lincoln and served from 1865 to 1869. He acted as Chargé d'affaires in Chile in the absence of the Minister in 1869.

Death and burial
Clark died in Watertown, New York on October 13, 1887. He was interred in Watertown's Brookside Cemetery.

Family
Clark's daughter Paulina Sabina was the wife of George A. Bagley.

References

External links

1810 births
1887 deaths
Town supervisors in New York (state)
New York (state) Whigs
People of New York (state) in the American Civil War
19th-century American diplomats
19th-century American newspaper publishers (people)
Republican Party members of the United States House of Representatives from New York (state)
People from Cooperstown, New York
19th-century American journalists
American male journalists
19th-century American male writers
19th-century American politicians